The Courtneys of Curzon Street (also titled The Courtney Affair or Kathy's Love Affair, in the U.S.) is a 1947 British drama film starring Anna Neagle and Michael Wilding. It is a study of class division and snobbery in Britain in the late 19th and early 20th centuries.

The film is one of the most seen British films of all time, with 15.9 million tickets sold at the cinema.

Plot
Edward Courtney, the son of a baronet shocks class-conscious 1900 British society by marrying Kate, his Irish servant. The film chronicles 45 years in their lives together and apart, through the Boer War and World War I and World War II.

The family live on Curzon Street, a high class street in the Mayfair district of London.

Kate begins to feel the awkwardness at a musical recital before Queen Victoria, where all the "true ladies" are staring at her. Later she hears gossip about herself.

Edward is an officer in the Horse Guards but Kate does not realise he cannot return her wave when he is on duty. She packs her bags and leaves without telling Edward. She returns to Ireland then develops an idea to be an actress, adopting the stage name of "May Lynton".

Meanwhile Edward goes in India where he accidentally finds the truth as to why she left.

Kate takes up her career as a singer in the theatre. Her father-in-law visits her backstage and gives her an update whilst trying to retain her separate identity. He says his wife is now dead... she missed her son and his wife too much. Kate also updates him, saying her father was killed at the Battle of Spion Kop.

The First World War starts and Edward returns from India and finds Kate. She confesses they have a son, also called Edward (Teddy). They go to visit him at his boarding school. The absence has been long as he is around 12 years old. They go out for high tea and discuss cricket and the new Rupert Brooke poem "The Soldier". The war ends.

Edward's father dies and he inherits the baronetcy. Kate becomes Lady Courtney. Meanwhile Teddy has joined the Army. He becomes engaged and marries before being posted to India. While his pregnant young wife is reading one of his letters home, a telegram arrives telling her that he has been killed in action. Devastated, she gives birth but dies in the process. Edward and Kate raise him. Edward loses badly in the 1929 Wall Street crash but they hang onto their home after Kate goes back on the stage. The Second World War sees Edward back as a Colonel in the Army and Kate an ENSA entertainer. They survive a fire at a factory and the film ends with their soldier grandson introducing his intended. While they are  happy that the old class prejudices that bedevilled their marriage have gone they are bemused that the parents of the intended are less sanguine. Fade to end credits.

Cast
Anna Neagle as Kate O'Halloran
Michael Wilding as Sir Edward Courtney
Gladys Young as Lady Courtney
Daphne Slater as Cynthia Carmody
Jack Watling as Teddy Courtney as a boy
Michael Medwin as Teddy Courtney as a man
Edgar Norfolk as Mr. W.
Edward Rigby as Mr R.
G. H. Mulcaster as Sir Edward Courtney Sr.
Coral Browne as Valerie
Alice Gachet as Louise
Helen Cherry as Mary Courtney
Ethel O'Shea as Mrs. O'Halloran
Terry Randall as Pam
Thora Hird as Maud
Nicholas Phipps as Phipps
Bernard Lee as Colonel Gascoyne
Max Kirby as Algy Longworth
Percy Walsh as Sir Frank Murchison

Production
It was originally known as Scarlet and Pure Gold. The film was produced at the Shepperton Film Studios in Surrey. The title was changed when the film was released in the U.S. and in other countries', having been screened in many European countries and Scandinavia.

Reception

Box office
It was the most popular film at the British box office for 1947. According to Kinematograph Weekly the 'biggest winner' at the box office in 1947 Britain was The Courtneys of Curzon Street, with "runners up" being The Jolson Story, Great Expectations, Odd Man Out, Frieda, Holiday Camp and Duel in the Sun.

Critical reception
Film4.com called it an "entertaining romantic saga spanning three generations."
The New York Times wrote "the romantic drama creaks soggily through three generations."

References

External links
 
 

1947 films
1940s historical films
British black-and-white films
British historical films
1940s English-language films
British romantic drama films
Films directed by Herbert Wilcox
Films set in London
Films set in the 19th century
1940s British films